Litadeini  is a pan-tropical tribe of lace bugs. Thirteen genera have been recorded.

Physical traits

This tribe is unique among tingidae in having the second tarsal segment wider than the first.

List of genera

Aeopelys Drake and Ruhoff
Aristobyrsa Drake and Poor
Cephalidiosus Guilbert
Cottothucha Drake and Poor
Holophygdon Kirkaldy
Larotingis Drake
Litadea China
Oecharis Drake and Ruhoff
Ogrygotingis Drake
Palauella Drake
Psilobyrsa Drake and Hambleton
Stragulotingis Froeschner
Tadelia Linnavuori

References

Froeschner, R.C., 2001. Lace Bug Genera of the World, II: Subfamily Tinginae: tribes Litadeini and Ypsotingini (Heteroptera: Tingidae). Smithsonian Contributions to Zoology, No. 611.

Drake, C.J. & Ruhoff, F.A., 1960. Lace-bug genera of the world. (Hemiptera: Tingidae). Proc. U.S. Natl. Mus. 112 (3431): 1-105, 9 pls.

Drake, C.J. & Ruhoff, F.A., 1965. Lace-bugs of the world: a catalogue. (Hemiptera: Tingidae). Bulletin of the United States National Museum: 243, 1-643.

http://www.redalyc.org/pdf/505/50500106.pdf

Tingidae
Hemiptera tribes